Levoberezhny District is the name of several administrative and municipal districts in Russia. The name literally means "located on the left bank".

Districts of the federal subjects

Levoberezhny District, Moscow, a district in Northern Administrative Okrug of Moscow

City divisions
Levoberezhny Territorial Okrug, a city okrug of Lipetsk, the administrative center of Lipetsk Oblast
Levoberezhny City District, Voronezh, a city district of Voronezh, the administrative center of Voronezh Oblast

See also
Levoberezhny (disambiguation)

References